Robert Michael Roop  (born July 22, 1942) is an American retired amateur wrestler and professional wrestler whose career spanned high school, college, the United States Army, amateur and professional wrestling. He was an American heavyweight Greco-Roman wrestler at the 1968 Summer Olympics.

Amateur wrestling career 

Robert Roop began wrestling in the eighth grade in East Lansing, Michigan. In High School, Roop was varsity heavyweight as a freshman, with an inauspicious 0-22-1 record. With the guidance of coach Joe Dibello, his record improved in ensuing years, with a 27-0-0 record his senior year, in which he also took State Championship.

He entered Michigan State University on a football scholarship. After a year and a half, he left school to join the Army. He received paratrooper training, and signed on to become a Special Forces medic. He competed on the All-Army wrestling team and, later, the All-Services wrestling team. There was one other heavyweight on the All-Services team, Jim Rasher, who had won a bronze medal as the U.S. Greco-Roman Heavyweight at the World Games prior to entering the Army. Rasher was influential in Roop's decision to pursue amateur wrestling.

After his three-year stint in the service, he entered Southern Illinois University, and began pursuing amateur wrestling. He attended from 1965 through 1969, majoring in political science, and was a collegiate wrestling standout with a win–loss record of 66-18, including a 16-3 record during his senior year.

While in college he won four National Amateur Athletic Union All-American rankings, earned by placing in the top four spots in the national tournament, and an NAAU Championship as a light-heavyweight. During his last year of college, his coach at Southern Illinois convinced him to train down to a lighter weight of 220 pounds.

The team was coached by legendary wrestling coach Henry Wittenberg. Roop finished in seventh place, losing to Aleksandr Medved, who went on to win the gold medal.

Professional wrestling career 
Roop began his professional career in 1969 after a meeting with his long-time friend Larry Heiniemi, better known as Lars Anderson. Heiniemi's tales of global travel and financial success appealed to Roop who began working for Eddie Graham, the promoter of Championship Wrestling from Florida and who traiend Roop. Working as an arrogant villain and flaunting his genuine amateur wrestling credentials, Roop challenged for the NWA World Heavyweight Championship on five occasions.

In 1976, Bob Roop received a possible career ending knee injury while wrestling Eddie Graham. The move which supposedly caused the injury, the figure-four, was banned as a crippling hold. While Roop was supposedly recovering, a new wrestler, The Gladiator, appeared on the Florida wrestling scene. The masked Gladiator used the shoulderbreaker, Roop's signature finishing move, and crowds shouted Roop's name when he appeared in the ring. During a Gladiator match on the Championship Wrestling from Florida TV program, Eddie and Mike Graham ran in on the match and removed the mask. The Gladiator was revealed as Roop. This incident is listed as number 24 in the CWF's "The Twenty-Five Greatest Angles In CWF History". After the unmasking, the figure-four was reinstated. This angle was used in 1977 in Roy Shire San Francisco NWA territory as Roop was "injured" by Kevin Sullivan and then a masked wrestler named The Star Warrior showed up around the same time Roop was injured; later, Sullivan unmasked Star Warrior, who was Roop.

Roop also wrestled and sporadically commentated for a time in Mid-South Wrestling, and he is often incorrectly credited for being the man who created the reversal to the figure four leg lock, the hold that "injured" him in Florida. "Cowboy" Bob Ellis used the maneuver against Buddy Rogers back in the early 1960s.

In the 1980s, Roop wrestled in Angelo Poffo's International Championship Wrestling (ICW) promotion out of Lexington, Kentucky.  The promotion at the time featured such future wrestling superstars as 'The Macho Man' Randy Savage, 'The Genius' Lanny Poffo, "Cowboy" Bob Orton Jr. and Ronnie 'Hands of Stone' Garvin.

Roop later became part of the Army of Darkness stable which included Kevin Sullivan, Purple Haze, Luna Vachon and Lock, Kharma/Molokai and Fallen Angel. Roop adopted the ring name Mayha Singh, shaving off the hair and beard on half his head and putting face paint on the shaved side.

Retirement 
Roop retired from wrestling in 1988 due to a neck injury suffered in a car crash. At the time he also handled booking duties and trained wrestlers at a school in Davie, Florida. An early student of his was Lawrence Pfohl, the future Lex Luger, who Roop broke into the business before turned over training duties to Hiro Matsuda. Looking back on his career in 2000, Roop stated "I had a hell of a lot of fun doing it, and it was quite an education."

Since retirement, Roop has lived in Michigan and worked as a Boy Scouts troop leader.

On July 15, 2006, Bob Roop was inducted into the George Tragos/Lou Thesz Professional Wrestling Hall of Fame. The ceremony was held at the International Wrestling Institute and Museum then in Newton, Iowa (now in Waterloo, Iowa).

Other media 
Roop made a cameo appearance in the 1978 Sylvester Stallone movie Paradise Alley.

Personal life 
Roop was married and has two sons.

Championships and accomplishments

Amateur wrestling
Michigan State Wrestling Championship
NCAA Championship (1 time) in 1967

Professional wrestling
Big Time Wrestling (San Francisco)
[[NWA United States Heavyweight Championship (San Francisco version)|NWA United States Heavyweight Championship (San Francisco version)]] (1 time)
Cauliflower Alley Club
Gulf Coast/CAC Honoree (2003)
Lou Thesz Award (2009)
Championship Wrestling from Florida
NWA Brass Knuckles Championship (Florida version) (1 time)
NWA Florida Heavyweight Championship (4 times)
NWA Florida Tag Team Championship (4 times) - with Boris Malenko (1), Harley Race (1), and Bob Orton, Jr. (2)
NWA Florida Television Championship (1 time)
NWA Southern Tag Team Championship (Florida version) (1 time) – with Buddy Fuller
George Tragos/Lou Thesz Professional Wrestling Hall of Fame
Class of 2006
Georgia Championship Wrestling
NWA World Television Championship (Georgia version) (2 times)
International Championship Wrestling
ICW Southeastern Tag Team Championship (3 times) - with Bob Orton, Jr. (1), Terry Gibbs (1), and Big Boy Williams (1)
ICW Television Championship (2 times)
Mid-South Wrestling Association
Mid-South Louisiana Heavyweight Championship (1 time)
Mid-South North American Heavyweight Championship (1 time)Pro Wrestling IllustratedPWI ranked him # 342 of the 500 best singles wrestlers during the "PWI Years" in 2003
Professional Wrestling Hall of Fame
Class of 2019
Southeastern Championship Wrestling
NWA Southeastern Heavyweight Championship (Northern Division) (1 time)1
NWA Southeastern Tag Team Championship (2 times) - with Jimmy Golden (1) and Bob Orton, Jr. (1)
NWA Southeastern Television Championship (1 time)

 Bibliography Death Match, Shoulderbreaker Publications (2002) The Wrestlers' Wrestlers: The Masters of the Craft of Professional Wrestling'', ECW Press 2021

References

External links 
 
 

1947 births
American male professional wrestlers
21st-century American novelists
American male novelists
Living people
Michigan State Spartans football players
People from Blacksburg, Virginia
Professional wrestlers from Virginia
Professional Wrestling Hall of Fame and Museum
Professional wrestling trainers
Professional wrestlers from Michigan
Olympic wrestlers of the United States
Wrestlers at the 1968 Summer Olympics
American male sport wrestlers
21st-century American male writers
20th-century professional wrestlers
NWA Florida Heavyweight Champions
NWA Florida Tag Team Champions
NWA Florida Television Champions
NWA Brass Knuckles Champions (Florida version)
NWA National Television Champions